Poll Islet, (also known as Guijar or Poll Island), is an Australian island in the center of the Torres Strait Islands. It is within the Guijar Islet locality in the Torres Strait Island Region local government area.

Poll Islet has a surface area of about 11 hectares, and is enclosed by a 5 km² oval-shaped coral reef known as the Poll Islet Reef.

See also 
 List of Torres Strait Islands

References

Uninhabited islands of Australia
Islands of Queensland
Islands of the Pacific Ocean
Torres Strait Islands
Torres Strait Island Region